

Events

Pre-1600
 380 – Theodosius I makes his adventus, or formal entry, into Constantinople.
1190 – Conrad of Montferrat becomes King of Jerusalem upon his marriage to Isabella I of Jerusalem.
1221 – Genghis Khan defeats the renegade Khwarazmian prince Jalal al-Din at the Battle of the Indus, completing the Mongol conquest of Central Asia.
1227 – Gąsawa massacre: At an assembly of Piast dukes at Gąsawa, Polish Prince Leszek the White,  Duke Henry the Bearded and others are attacked by assassins while bathing. 
1248 – An overnight landslide on the north side of Mont Granier, one of the largest historical rockslope failures ever recorded in Europe, destroys five villages.
1359 – Peter I of Cyprus ascends the throne of Cyprus after his father, Hugh IV of Cyprus, abdicates.
1429 – Hundred Years' War: Joan of Arc unsuccessfully besieges La Charité.
1542 – Battle of Solway Moss: An English army defeats a much larger Scottish force near the River Esk in Dumfries and Galloway.

1601–1900
1642 – Abel Tasman becomes the first European to discover the island Van Diemen's Land (later renamed Tasmania).
1750 – Tarabai, regent of the Maratha Empire, imprisons Rajaram II of Satara for refusing to remove Balaji Baji Rao from the post of peshwa.
1832 – South Carolina passes the Ordinance of Nullification, declaring that the Tariffs of 1828 and 1832 were null and void in the state, beginning the Nullification Crisis.
1835 – The Texas Provincial Government authorizes the creation of a horse-mounted police force called the Texas Rangers (which is now the Texas Ranger Division of the Texas Department of Public Safety).
1850 – Danish troops defeat a Schleswig-Holstein force in the town of Lottorf, Schleswig-Holstein.
1863 – American Civil War: Battle of Lookout Mountain: Near Chattanooga, Tennessee, Union forces under General Ulysses S. Grant capture Lookout Mountain and begin to break the Confederate siege of the city led by General Braxton Bragg.
1877 – Anna Sewell's animal welfare novel Black Beauty is published.

1901–present
1906 – A 13–6 victory by the Massillon Tigers over their rivals, the Canton Bulldogs, for the "Ohio League" Championship, leads to accusations that the championship series was fixed and results in the first major scandal in professional American football.
1917 – In Milwaukee, nine members of the Milwaukee Police Department are killed by a bomb, the most deaths in a single event in U.S. police history until the September 11 attacks in 2001. 
1922 – Nine Irish Republican Army members are executed by an Irish Free State firing squad. Among them is author Erskine Childers, who had been arrested for illegally carrying a revolver.
1929 – The Finnish far-right Lapua Movement officially begins when a group of mainly the former White Guard members, led by Vihtori Kosola, interrupted communism occasion at the Workers' House in Lapua, Finland.
1932 – In Washington, D.C., the FBI Scientific Crime Detection Laboratory (better known as the FBI Crime Lab) officially opens.
1935 – The Senegalese Socialist Party holds its second congress.
1940 – World War II: The First Slovak Republic becomes a signatory to the Tripartite Pact, officially joining the Axis powers.
1941 – World War II: The United States grants Lend-Lease to the Free French Forces.
1944 – World War II: The 73rd Bombardment Wing launches the first attack on Tokyo from the Northern Mariana Islands.
1962 – Cold War: The West Berlin branch of the Socialist Unity Party of Germany forms a separate party, the Socialist Unity Party of West Berlin.
  1962   – The influential British satirical television programme That Was the Week That Was is first broadcast.
1963 – Lee Harvey Oswald, the assassin of President John F. Kennedy, is killed by Jack Ruby.
1965 – Joseph-Désiré Mobutu seizes power in the Democratic Republic of the Congo and becomes President; he rules the country (which he renames Zaire in 1971) for over 30 years, until being overthrown by rebels in 1997.
1966 – Bulgarian TABSO Flight 101 crashes near Bratislava, Czechoslovakia, killing all 82 people on board.
1969 – Apollo program: The Apollo 12 command module splashes down safely in the Pacific Ocean, ending the second manned mission to land on the Moon.
1971 – During a severe thunderstorm over Washington state, a hijacker calling himself Dan Cooper (aka D. B. Cooper) parachutes from a Northwest Orient Airlines plane with $200,000 in ransom money. He has never been found.
1973 – A national speed limit is imposed on the Autobahn in Germany because of the 1973 oil crisis. The speed limit lasts only four months.
1974 – Donald Johanson and Tom Gray discover the 40% complete Australopithecus afarensis skeleton, nicknamed "Lucy" (after The Beatles song "Lucy in the Sky with Diamonds"), in the Awash Valley of Ethiopia's Afar Depression.
1976 – The Çaldıran–Muradiye earthquake in eastern Turkey kills between 4,000 and 5,000 people.
1989 – After a week of mass protests against the Communist regime known as the Velvet Revolution, Miloš Jakeš and the entire Politburo of the Czechoslovak Communist Party resign from office.  This brings an effective end to Communist rule in Czechoslovakia.
1992 – China Southern Airlines Flight 3943 crashes on approach to Guilin Qifengling Airport in Guilin, China, killing all 141 people on board.
2009 – The Avdhela Project, an Aromanian digital library and cultural initiative, is founded in Bucharest, Romania.
2012 – A fire at a clothing factory in Dhaka, Bangladesh, kills at least 112 people.
2013 – Iran signs an interim agreement with the P5+1 countries, limiting its nuclear program in exchange for reduced sanctions.
2015 – A Russian Air Force Sukhoi Su-24 fighter jet is shot down by the Turkish Air Force over the Syria–Turkey border, killing one of the two pilots; a Russian marine is also killed during a subsequent rescue effort.
  2015   – A terrorist attack on a hotel in Al-Arish, Egypt, kills at least seven people and injures 12 others.
  2015   – An explosion on a bus carrying Tunisian Presidential Guard personnel in Tunisia's capital Tunis leaves at least 14 people dead.
2016 – The government of Colombia and the Revolutionary Armed Forces of Colombia—People's Army sign a revised peace deal, bringing an end to the country's more than 50-year-long civil war.
2022 – Five days after the general elections which resulted in a hung parliament, opposition leader and former deputy prime minister Anwar Ibrahim is officially named as the 10th prime minister of Malaysia.

Births

Pre-1600
1273 – Alphonso, Earl of Chester (d. 1284)
1394 – Charles, Duke of Orléans (d. 1465)
1427 – John Stafford, 1st Earl of Wiltshire, English nobleman (d. 1473)
1472 – Pietro Torrigiano, Italian sculptor (d. 1528)
1583 – Juan Martínez de Jáuregui y Aguilar, Spanish poet and painter (d. 1641)
  1583   – Philip Massinger, English dramatist (d. 1640)
1594 – Henry Grey, 10th Earl of Kent, English politician, Lord Lieutenant of Bedfordshire (d. 1651)

1601–1900
1603 – John, Count of Nassau-Idstein (1629–1677) (d. 1677)
1615 – Philip William, Elector Palatine (d. 1690)
1630 – Étienne Baluze, French scholar and academic (d. 1718)
1632 – Baruch Spinoza, Dutch philosopher and scholar (d. 1677)
1655 – Charles XI of Sweden (d. 1697)
1690 – Charles Theodore Pachelbel, German organist and composer (d. 1750)
1712 – Charles-Michel de l'Épée, French priest and educator (d. 1789)
  1712   – Ali II ibn Hussein, Tunisian ruler (d. 1782)
1713 – Junípero Serra, Spanish priest and missionary (d. 1784)
  1713   – Laurence Sterne, Irish novelist and clergyman (d. 1768)
1724 – Maria Amalia of Saxony (d. 1760)
1729 – Alexander Suvorov, Russian field marshal (d. 1800)
1745 – Maria Luisa of Spain (d. 1792)
1774 – Thomas Dick, Scottish minister, author, and educator (d. 1857)
1784 – Zachary Taylor, American general and politician, 12th President of the United States (d. 1850)
1801 – Ludwig Bechstein, German author and poet (d. 1860)
1806 – William Webb Ellis, English priest, created Rugby football (d. 1872)
1811 – Ulrich Ochsenbein, Swiss lawyer and politician, President of the Swiss National Council (d. 1890)
1812 – Xavier Hommaire de Hell, French geographer and engineer (d. 1848)
1826 – Carlo Collodi, Italian journalist and author (d. 1890)
1840 – John Alfred Brashear, American scientist, telescope maker and educator (d. 1920)
1849 – Frances Hodgson Burnett, English-American novelist and playwright (d. 1924)
1851 – John Indermaur, British lawyer (d. 1925)
1857 – Miklós Kovács, Hungarian-Slovene poet and songwriter (d. 1937)
1859 – Cass Gilbert, American architect, designed the United States Supreme Court Building and Woolworth Building (d. 1934)
1864 – Henri de Toulouse-Lautrec, French painter and illustrator (d. 1901)
1868 – Scott Joplin, American pianist and composer (d. 1917)
1869 – Óscar Carmona, Portuguese field marshal and politician, 11th President of Portugal (d. 1951)
1873 – Julius Martov, Russian politician (d. 1923)
  1873   – Herbert Roper Barrett, English tennis player (d. 1943)
1874 – Charles William Miller, Brazilian footballer and referee (d. 1953)
1876 – Walter Burley Griffin, American architect and urban planner, designed Canberra (d. 1937)
1877 – Alben W. Barkley, American lawyer and politician, 35th Vice President of the United States (d. 1956)
  1877   – Kavasji Jamshedji Petigara, Indian police officer (d. 1941)
1879 – Wylie Cameron Grant, American tennis player (d. 1968)
1881 – Al Christie, Canadian-American director, producer, and screenwriter (d. 1951)
1882 – Nikolai Janson, Russian politician (d. 1938)
1884 – Yitzhak Ben-Zvi, Ukrainian-Israeli historian and politician, 2nd President of Israel (d. 1963)
1885 – Theodor Altermann, Estonian actor, director, and producer (d. 1915)
  1885   – Christian Wirth, German SS officer (d. 1944)
1886 – Margaret Caroline Anderson, American publisher, founded The Little Review (d. 1973)
1887 – Raoul Paoli, French boxer and rower (d. 1960)
  1887   – Erich von Manstein, German field marshal (d. 1973)
1888 – Dale Carnegie, American author and educator (d. 1955)
  1888   – Fredrick Willius, American cardiologist and author (d. 1972)
1891 – Vasil Gendov, Bulgarian actor, director, and screenwriter (d. 1970)
1893 – Charles F. Hurley, American soldier and politician, 54th Governor of Massachusetts (d. 1946)
1894 – Herbert Sutcliffe, English cricketer and businessman (d. 1978)
1895 – Esther Applin, American geologist and paleontologist (d. 1972)
1897 – Lucky Luciano, Italian-American mob boss (d. 1962)
  1897   – Dorothy Shepherd-Barron, English tennis player (d. 1953)
1899 – Ward Morehouse, American author, playwright, and critic (d. 1966)

1901–present
1904 – Albert Ross Tilley, Canadian captain and surgeon (d. 1988)
1908 – Libertad Lamarque, Argentinian actress and singer (d. 2000)
1910 – Larry Siemering, American football player and coach (d. 2009)
1911 – Kirby Grant, American actor (d. 1985)
  1911   – Joe Medwick, American baseball player and manager (d. 1975)
1912 – Bernard Delfgaauw, Dutch philosopher and academic (d. 1993)
  1912   – Garson Kanin, American director and screenwriter (d. 1999)
  1912   – Joan Sanderson, English actress (d. 1992)
  1912   – Charles Schneeman, American soldier and illustrator (d. 1972)
  1912   – Teddy Wilson, American pianist and educator (d. 1986)
1913 – Howard Duff, American actor, director, and producer (d. 1990)
  1913   – Geraldine Fitzgerald, Irish-American actress (d. 2005)
1914 – Lynn Chadwick, English sculptor (d. 2003)
  1914   – Bessie Blount Griffin, American physical therapist, inventor and forensic scientist (d. 2009)
1916 – Forrest J Ackerman, American soldier and author (d. 2008)
  1917   – Shabtai Rosenne, English-Israeli academic, jurist, and diplomat (d. 2010)
1919 – David Kossoff, English actor and screenwriter (d. 2005)
1921 – John Lindsay, American lawyer and politician, 103rd Mayor of New York City (d. 2000)
1922 – Claus Moser, Baron Moser, German-English statistician and academic (d. 2015)
1924 – Eileen Barton, American singer (d. 2006)
  1924   – Lorne Munroe, Canadian-American cellist and educator (d. 2020)
1925 – William F. Buckley, Jr., American publisher and author, founded the National Review (d. 2008)
  1925   – Simon van der Meer, Dutch-Swiss physicist and engineer, Nobel Prize laureate (d. 2011)
1926 – Tsung-Dao Lee, Chinese-American physicist and academic, Nobel Prize laureate
1927 – Ahmadou Kourouma, Ivorian-French author and playwright (d. 2003)
  1927   – Alfredo Kraus, Spanish tenor (d. 1999)
  1927   – Kevin Skinner, New Zealand rugby player (d. 2014)
1929 – Franciszek Kokot, Polish nephrologist and endocrinologist (d. 2021)
  1929   – George Moscone, American soldier, lawyer, and politician, 37th Mayor of San Francisco (d. 1978)
1930 – Ken Barrington, English cricketer (d. 1981)
  1930   – Bob Friend, American baseball player and politician (d. 2019)
1931 – Tommy Allsup, American guitarist (d. 2017)
  1931   – Arthur Chaskalson, South African lawyer and judge, 18th Chief Justice of South Africa (d. 2012)
1932 – Claudio Naranjo, Chilean psychiatrist (d. 2019)
  1932   – Fred Titmus, English cricketer and coach (d. 2011)
1933 – John Sheridan, English rugby player and coach (d. 2012)
1934 – Alfred Schnittke, German-Russian journalist and composer (d. 1998)
1935 – Khalifa bin Salman Al Khalifa, Bahraini politician, Prime Minister of Bahrain (d. 2020)
  1935   – Ron Dellums, American soldier and politician, 48th Mayor of Oakland (d. 2018)
  1935   – Mordicai Gerstein, American author, illustrator, and director (d. 2019)
1938 – Willy Claes, Belgian conductor and politician, 8th Secretary General of NATO
  1938   – Oscar Robertson, American basketball player and sportscaster
  1938   – Charles Starkweather, American spree killer (d. 1959)
1940 – Marshall Berman, American philosopher and Marxist humanist writer (d. 2013)
1940 – Paul Tagliabue, American lawyer and businessman, 5th Commissioner of the National Football League
  1940   – Eric Wilson, Canadian author and educator
1941 – Pete Best, Indian-English drummer and songwriter 
  1941   – Donald "Duck" Dunn, American bass player, songwriter, and producer (d. 2012)
  1941   – Wayne Jackson, American trumpeter (d. 2016)  
1942 – Billy Connolly, Scottish comedian and actor
  1942   – Marlin Fitzwater, American soldier and journalist, 17th White House Press Secretary
  1942   – Jean Ping, Gabonese politician and diplomat
  1942   – Andrew Stunell, English minister and politician
1943 – Dave Bing, American basketball player and politician, 70th Mayor of Detroit
  1943   – Richard Tee, American singer-songwriter and keyboard player (d. 1993)
  1943   – Robin Williamson, Scottish singer-songwriter and guitarist 
  1943   – Margaret E. M. Tolbert, American chemist and academic
1944 – Bev Bevan, English drummer
  1944   – Candy Darling, American model and actress (d. 1974)
  1944   – Ibrahim Gambari, Nigerian academic and diplomat, 9th Nigerian Minister of Foreign Affairs
  1944   – Dan Glickman, American businessman and politician, 26th United States Secretary of Agriculture
1945 – Nuruddin Farah, Somali novelist
  1945   – Lee Michaels, American singer-songwriter and musician
1946 – Ted Bundy, American serial killer (d. 1989) 
  1946   – Tony Clarkin, English guitarist and songwriter 
  1946   – Penny Jordan, English author (d. 2011)
1947 – Dwight Schultz, American actor
  1947   – Dave Sinclair, English keyboard player
1948 – Spider Robinson, American-Canadian author and critic
  1948   – Rudy Tomjanovich, American basketball player and coach
  1948   – Steve Yeager, American baseball player and coach
1949 – Shane Bourne, Australian comedian, actor, and television host
  1949   – Ewen Cameron, Baron Cameron of Dillington, English politician
  1949   – Sally Davies, English hematologist and academic
1950 – Bob Burns, American drummer and songwriter (d. 2015)
  1950   – Stanley Livingston, American actor, director, producer, and screenwriter
1951 – Mimis Androulakis, Greek author and politician
  1951   – Chet Edwards, American businessman and politician
  1951   – Margaret Mountford, Northern Irish-British lawyer and businesswoman
  1951   – Graham Price, Egyptian-Welsh rugby player
1952 – Parveen Shakir, Pakistani Urdu poet (d. 1994)
  1952   – Rachel Chagall, American actress
  1952   – Norbert Haug, German journalist and businessman
  1952   – Thierry Lhermitte, French actor, producer, and screenwriter
  1952   – Jim Sheridan, Scottish politician
  1952   – Ken Wilson, Australian rugby league player
1954 – Emir Kusturica, Serbian actor, director, and screenwriter
  1954   – Margaret Wetherell, English psychologist and academic
  1954   – Clem Burke, American drummer
1955 – Ian Botham, English cricketer, footballer, and sportscaster
  1955   – Scott Hoch, American golfer
  1955   – Lena Adelsohn Liljeroth, Swedish politician, Swedish Minister for Culture
  1955   – Najib Mikati, Lebanese businessman and politician, 31st Prime Minister of Lebanon
  1955   – Takashi Yuasa, Japanese lawyer and author
1956 – Ruben Santiago-Hudson, American actor, playwright, and director 
1957 – Denise Crosby, American actress and producer
  1957   – Edward Stourton, English journalist and author
1958 – Roy Aitken, Scottish footballer and manager
  1958   – Margaret Curran, Scottish academic and politician
  1958   – Nick Knight, British photographer
1959 – Todd Brooker, Canadian skier and sportscaster
1960 – Edgar Meyer, American bassist and composer 
1961 – Carlos Carnero, Spanish lawyer and politician
  1961   – Arundhati Roy, Indian writer and activist, recipient of Booker Prize
1962 – John Kovalic, English author and illustrator
  1962   – John Squire, English singer-songwriter and guitarist 
  1962   – Paul Thorburn, German-Welsh rugby player and manager
  1962   – Ioannis Topalidis, Greek footballer and manager
  1962   – Tracey Wickham, Australian swimmer
1963 – Neale Cooper, Scottish footballer (d. 2018)
1964 – Garret Dillahunt, American actor
  1964   – Brad Sherwood, American actor and game show host
1965 – Shirley Henderson, Scottish actress
1966 – Russell Watson, English tenor and actor
1967 – Henrik Brockmann, Danish singer-songwriter 
  1967   – Cal Eldred, American baseball player and sportscaster
  1967   – Jon Hein, American radio personality
1968 – Bülent Korkmaz, Turkish footballer and manager
  1968   – Dawn Robinson, American singer and actress
1969 – David Adeang, Nauruan lawyer and politician
  1969   – Romesh Kaluwitharana, Sri Lankan cricketer
  1969   – Rob Nicholson, American bass player and songwriter 
1970 – Doug Brien, American football player
  1970   – Julieta Venegas, American-Mexican singer-songwriter, guitarist, and producer
  1970   – Ashley Ward, English footballer and businessman
1971 – Cosmas Ndeti, Kenyan runner
  1971   – Keith Primeau, Canadian-American ice hockey player and coach
1972 – Marek Lemsalu, Estonian footballer
  1972   – Ruxandra Dragomir, Romanian tennis player
1973 – Alejandro Ávila, Mexican telenovela actor
1974 – Stephen Merchant, English actor, director, producer, and screenwriter
  1974   – Machel Montano, Trinidadian singer-songwriter and producer 
  1974   – Tarō Yamamoto, Japanese actor and politician
  1974   – Amy Faye Hayes, American boxing ring announcer and model
1975 – Thomas Kohnstamm, American author
1976 – Christian Laflamme, Canadian ice hockey player
  1976   – Chen Lu, Chinese figure skater
  1976   – Mona Hanna-Attisha, British-American pediatrician, professor, and public health advocate
1977 – Colin Hanks, American actor
  1977   – Celaleddin Koçak, German-Turkish footballer
1978 – Katherine Heigl, American actress and producer
1979 – Joseba Llorente, Spanish footballer
1980 – Kabir Ali, English cricketer
  1980   – Beth Phoenix, American wrestler
1982 – Ryan Fitzpatrick, American football player
  1982   – Sean O'Loughlin, English rugby player
1983 – Dean Ashton, English footballer
  1983   – Lars Eckert, German rugby player
  1983   – André Laurito, German footballer
  1983   – Gwilym Lee, Welsh actor
  1983   – José López, Venezuelan baseball player
  1983   – Karine Vanasse, Canadian actress and producer
1984 – Maria Höfl-Riesch, German skier
1985 – Julia Alexandratou, Greek model, actress, and singer
  1985   – Tony Hunt, American football player
1986 – Pedro León, Spanish footballer
  1986   – Mohamed Massaquoi, American football player
1990 – Sarah Hyland, American actress 
  1990   – Tom Odell, English singer-songwriter
  1990   – Michael Oldfield, Australian rugby league player
  1990   – Mario Gaspar, Spanish footballer
1992 – Sergei Kulbach, Ukrainian figure skater
1993 – Ivi Adamou, Cypriot-Greek singer-songwriter
  1993   – Joe Pigott, English footballer
1994 – Nabil Bentaleb, Algerian footballer

Deaths

Pre-1600
 654 – Emperor Kōtoku of Japan (b. 596)
1072 – Bagrat IV of Georgia (b. 1018)
1227 – Leszek I the White, High Duke of Poland (b. c. 1186)
1265 – Magnús Óláfsson, King of Mann and the Isles
1326 – Hugh Despenser the Younger, English courtier (b. 1296)
1426 – Elizabeth of Lancaster, Duchess of Exeter, (b. c. 1363)
1468 – Jean de Dunois, French soldier (b. 1402)
1492 – Loys of Gruuthuse, Earl of Winchester (b. c. 1427)
1530 – Mingyi Nyo, Burmese ruler (b. 1459)
1531 – Johannes Oecolampadius, German theologian and reformer (b. 1482)
1572 – John Knox, Scottish pastor and theologian (b. 1510)
1583 – René de Birague, French cardinal (b. 1506)

1601–1900
1615 – Sethus Calvisius, German composer and theorist (b. 1556)
1642 – Walatta Petros, saint in the Ethiopian Orthodox Tewahedo Church (b. 1592)
1650 – Manuel Cardoso, Portuguese organist and composer (b. 1566)
1675 – Guru Tegh Bahadur, Indian guru (b. 1621)
1722 – Johann Adam Reincken, Dutch-German organist and composer (b. 1623)
1741 – Ulrika Eleonora, Queen of Sweden (b. 1688)
1770 – Charles-Jean-François Hénault, French historian and author (b. 1685)
1775 – Lorenzo Ricci, Italian religious leader, 18th Superior General of the Society of Jesus (b. 1703)
1781 – James Caldwell, American minister (b. 1734)
1793 – Clément Charles François de Laverdy, French lawyer and politician, French Minister of Finance (b. 1723)
1801 – Franz Moritz von Lacy, Austrian field marshal (b. 1725)
  1801   – Philip Hamilton, Oldest son of Alexander Hamilton (b. 1782)
1807 – Joseph Brant, American tribal leader (b. 1742)
1848 – William Lamb, 2nd Viscount Melbourne, English politician, Prime Minister of the United Kingdom (b. 1779)
1870 – Comte de Lautréamont, Uruguayan-French poet and author (b. 1846)
1885 – Nicolás Avellaneda, Argentinian journalist and politician, 8th President of Argentina (b. 1837)
1890 – August Belmont, German-American banker and politician, 16th United States Ambassador to the Netherlands (b. 1816)
1895 – Ludwik Teichmann, Polish anatomist (b. 1823)

1901–present
1916 – Hiram Maxim, American-English engineer, invented the Maxim gun (b. 1840)
1920 – Lado Aleksi-Meskhishvili, Georgian actor and director (b. 1857)
  1920   – Alexandru Macedonski, Romanian author and poet (b. 1854)
1922 – Erskine Childers, Irish soldier, journalist, and author (b. 1870)
1929 – Georges Clemenceau, French physician, publisher, and politician, 72nd Prime Minister of France (b. 1841)
1932 – William Arnon Henry American academic and agriculturist (b. 1850)
1943 – Doris Miller, American soldier and chef, Navy Cross recipient (b. 1919)
1948 – Anna Jarvis, American founder of Mother's Day (b. 1864)
1954 – Mamie Dillard, African American educator, clubwoman and suffragist (b. 1874)
1956 – Guido Cantelli, Italian conductor (b. 1920)
1957 – Diego Rivera, Mexican painter and sculptor (b. 1886)
1958 – Robert Cecil, 1st Viscount Cecil of Chelwood, English lawyer and politician, Chancellor of the Duchy of Lancaster, Nobel Prize laureate (b. 1864)
1959 – Dally Messenger, Australian rugby player, cricketer, and sailor (b. 1883)
1960 – Grand Duchess Olga Alexandrovna of Russia (b. 1882)
1961 – Ruth Chatterton, American actress (b. 1892)
1963 – Lee Harvey Oswald, American assassin of John F. Kennedy (b. 1939)
1965 – Abdullah III Al-Salim Al-Sabah, Kuwaiti ruler (b. 1895)
1968 – D. A. Levy, American poet and publisher (b. 1942)
1973 – John Neihardt, American author and poet (b. 1881)
1980 – Herbert Agar, American journalist and historian (b. 1897)
  1980   – George Raft, American actor and dancer (b. 1901)
  1980   – Molly Reilly, Canadian aviator (b. 1922)
  1980   – Henrietta Hill Swope, American astronomer and academic (b. 1902)
1982 – Barack Obama, Sr., Kenyan economist and academic, father of Barack Obama, 44th President of the United States (b. 1936)
1987 – Jehane Benoît, Canadian journalist and author (b. 1904)
1990 – Juan Manuel Bordeu, Argentinian race car driver (b. 1934)
  1990   – Fred Shero, Canadian ice hockey player and coach (b. 1925)
  1990   – Dodie Smith, English author and playwright (b. 1896)
  1990   – Marion Post Wolcott, American photographer (b. 1910)
  1990   – Bülent Arel, Turkish-American composer and educator (b. 1919)
1991 – Freddie Mercury, Tanzanian-English singer-songwriter, lead vocalist of Queen, and producer (b. 1946)
  1991   – Eric Carr, American drummer of KISS (b. 1950)
1993 – Albert Collins, American singer-songwriter and guitarist (b. 1932)
1995 – Eduard Ole, Estonian-Swedish painter (b. 1898) 
1996 – Sorley MacLean, Scottish soldier and poet (b. 1911)
1997 – Barbara, French singer-songwriter and actress (b. 1930)
2002 – John Rawls, American philosopher, author, and academic (b. 1921)
2003 – Warren Spahn, American baseball player and coach (b. 1921)
2004 – Arthur Hailey, English-Canadian journalist and author (b. 1920)
  2004   – Joseph Hansen, American author and poet (b. 1923)
  2004   – James Wong, Chinese actor and songwriter (b. 1940)
2005 – Pat Morita, American actor (b. 1932)
2006 – Juice Leskinen, Finnish singer-songwriter (b. 1950)
  2006   – George W. S. Trow, American author, playwright, and critic (b. 1943)
  2006   – Zdeněk Veselovský, Czech zoologist and ethologist (b. 1938)
2007 – Casey Calvert, American guitarist (b. 1981)
2008 – Kenny MacLean, Scottish-Canadian bass player and songwriter (b. 1956)
  2008   – Cecil H. Underwood, American educator and politician, 25th Governor of West Virginia (b. 1922)
2009 – Abe Pollin, American businessman and philanthropist (b. 1923)
  2009   – Samak Sundaravej, Thai politician, 25th Prime Minister of Thailand (b. 1935)
  2009   – Jun Ross, Filipino basketball player (b. 1949)
2010 – Huang Hua, Chinese translator and politician, 5th Foreign Minister of the People's Republic of China (b. 1913)
2012 – Héctor Camacho, Puerto Rican-American boxer (b. 1962)
  2012   – Antoine Kohn, Luxembourgian footballer and manager (b. 1933)
  2012   – Jimmy Stewart, American baseball player and manager (b. 1939)
  2012   – Nicholas Turro, American chemist and academic (b. 1938)
  2012   – Ernie Warlick, American football player and sportscaster (b. 1932)
2013 – Matthew Bucksbaum, American businessman and philanthropist, co-founded General Growth Properties (b. 1926)
  2013   – Arnaud Coyot, French cyclist (b. 1980)
  2013   – Lou Hyndman, Canadian lawyer and politician (b. 1935)
  2013   – June Keithley, Filipino actress and journalist (b. 1947)
  2013   – Jean King, American politician, 6th Lieutenant Governor of Hawaii (b. 1925)
  2013   – Robin Leigh-Pemberton, Baron Kingsdown, English banker and politician, Governor of the Bank of England (b. 1927)
  2013   – Matti Ranin, Finnish actor (b. 1926)
2014 – Jorge Herrera Delgado, Mexican engineer and politician (b. 1961)
  2014   – Murli Deora, Indian politician, Indian Minister of Corporate Affairs (b. 1937)
  2014   – Peter Henderson, New Zealand rugby player (b. 1926)
  2014   – Nenad Manojlović, Serbian water polo player and manager (b. 1957)
  2014   – Viktor Tikhonov, Russian ice hockey player and coach (b. 1930)
2015 – Robert Ford, English general (b. 1923)
  2015   – John Forrester, English historian and philosopher (b. 1949)
  2015   – Quincy Monk, American football player (b. 1979)
  2015   – Heinz Oberhummer, Austrian physicist, astronomer, and academic (b. 1941)
  2015   – Douglas W. Shorenstein, American businessman (b. 1955) 
2016 – Paul Futcher, English footballer (b. 1956)
  2016   – Florence Henderson, American actress, singer and television personality (b. 1934)
2019 – Goo Hara, South Korean singer and actress (b. 1991)
2022 – Börje Salming, Swedish hockey player (b. 1951)

Holidays and observances
Christian feast days:
Albert of Louvain
Andrew Dũng-Lạc, Pierre Dumoulin-Borie, and other Vietnamese Martyrs
Chrysogonus (Roman Catholic Church)
Colmán of Cloyne (Roman Catholic Church)
Eanflæd
Firmina (Roman Catholic Church)
Flavian of Ricina (Roman Catholic Church)
Flora and Maria
Jehu Jones (Lutheran)
Justus Falckner (Lutheran)
Kenan (Cianán)
Mercurius (Eastern Church)
Pierre Dumoulin-Borie
Protasius of Milan
Romanus of Blaye
November 24 (Eastern Orthodox liturgics)
Earliest day on which Harvest Day can fall, while November 30 is the latest; celebrated on the last Sunday in November. (Turkmenistan)
Earliest day on which Mother's Day can fall, while November 30 is the latest; celebrated on the last Sunday in November. (Russia)
Evolution Day (International observance)
Lachit Divas (Assam)
Martyrdom of Guru Tegh Bahadur (India)
Teachers' Day (Turkey)

References

External links

 
 
 

Days of the year
November